Piotr Tobolski (born 11 May 1958) is a Polish rower. He competed in the men's double sculls event at the 1980 Summer Olympics.

References

1958 births
Living people
Polish male rowers
Olympic rowers of Poland
Rowers at the 1980 Summer Olympics
People from Gniezno